Cambra is an unincorporated community in Huntington Township, Luzerne County, Pennsylvania, United States. Cambra has a post office with ZIP code 18611, which opened on June 10, 1822.

References

Unincorporated communities in Luzerne County, Pennsylvania
Unincorporated communities in Pennsylvania